Trevor Tarr (30 March 1923 – 6 September 1998) was a South African cricketer. He played in one first-class match for Border in 1951/52.

See also
 List of Border representative cricketers

References

External links
 

1923 births
1998 deaths
South African cricketers
Border cricketers